James Street railway station may refer to:

 Liverpool James Street railway station, a station in Liverpool, England, on the Wirral Line
 James Street railway station (Liverpool Overhead Railway), a former station in Liverpool, England
 James Street railway station, Hyderabad in India
 LIUNA Station in Hamilton, Ontario, Canada, formerly known as James Street railway station

See also
James Street (disambiguation)